The 2010–11 Baltic League (known as the Triobet Baltic League for sponsorship reasons) was a 16-team football tournament held in the Baltic states. Five top teams from each participating country – Estonia, Latvia, and Lithuania – along with the winner of the 2009–10 season played a 4-round and 2 legged (excluding final) play-off style knockout tournament. The competition was held from Autumn 2010 through Summer 2011.

Participating clubs
The clubs were divided into 4 pools depending on the rankings in their domestic leagues:

Pool 1
  Ventspilsth
  Ekranas
  Levadia
  Metalurgs

Pool 2
  Šiauliai
  Sillamäe Kalev
  Skonto
  Sūduva

Pool 3
  Flora
  Jūrmala
  Tauras
  Trans

Pool 4
  Banga
  Blāzma
  Kalju
  Olimps/RFS

Play-off Table

Round of 16

Goalscorers
As of 22 December 2010.

3 goals:
  Felipe Rodrigues
  Eduards Višņakovs

2 goals:

1 goal:

References

External links
 

2010-11
2011 in Estonian football
2011 in Latvian football
2011 in Lithuanian football
2010 in Estonian football
2010 in Latvian football
2010 in Lithuanian football